The men's 100 metres at the 2017 World Championships in Athletics was held at the London Olympic Stadium on . This meet was announced as the last competition for Usain Bolt. The race was won by Justin Gatlin of the United States, ahead of Gatlin's team-mate Christian Coleman, with Usain Bolt finishing third.

Background
Billed as his last individual race, world record holder and reigning world and Olympic champion Usain Bolt hoped to bow out of individual competition with one last gold medal. He originally planned to retire after the Summer Olympics in Rio De Janeiro the previous year, but decided to return due to his love for the London crowds. However, his season was hampered by his reoccurring hamstring injuries, as well as the death of his friend Germaine Mason. Coming into the championships, Bolt was only ranked 7th with 9.95 seconds. Meanwhile, young American Christian Coleman burst onto the athletics scene as the new favorite to dethrone Bolt, clocking a world-leading 9.82 seconds at the NCAA Championships and going on to win the 100-200 double. His only defeat came at the US Championships, where fellow Tennessee Vol and 2004 Olympic champion Justin Gatlin overtook the inexperienced Coleman, who overstrided towards the finish. The win came as a surprise for many, as the 35-year old veteran and 2005 world champion had an unusually rocky season despite being Bolt's biggest rival for the previous 4 years. Andre De Grasse of Canada also announced his intentions to defeat Bolt before his retirement; the triple medallist at the Rio Olympics proved he had the talent and confidence to stay calm against Bolt, especially when he rushed to the Jamaican's shoulder during the 200m semifinals. Despite not having gone under 10 seconds before the championships, many knew that De Grasse was a championship performer and would clock much faster times in London.

Meanwhile, Bolt's training partner and 2011 World Champion Yohan Blake, continued his injury comeback by winning the Jamaican 100m title in 9.90, the second fastest time of the year. Julian Forte and Senoj-Jay Givans, two sub-10 runners, filled out the Jamaican squad. Akani Simbine of South Africa was ranked 3rd in the year with 9.92, and won at the Doha Diamond League in May, though many believed he peaked too early as South African runners began their seasons in February. Christopher Belcher, the NCAA bronze medallist behind Coleman and ranked 4th in the year with 9.93, joined Coleman and Gatlin on the US squad. CJ Ujah of Great Britain appeared to be in top form, winning 3 Diamond League races in Rome, London, and Rabat, the latter in 9.98 seconds. In his absence, the incredibly fast-finishing Reece Prescod beat out former European Champion James Dasaolu at the British Championships. Other key players included co-European record holder and 3-time global finalist Jimmy Vicaut of France, 7th-ranked Thando Roto of South Africa, and Rio finalist Ben Youssef Meite of the Ivory Coast

Just days before the championships, De Grasse pulled out with a hamstring injury and was forced to miss his final chance to defeat Bolt.

Summary
Coleman won his heat with ease in 10.01. Japanese runner Abdul Hakim Sani Brown placed himself as a favorite and surprised many by beating Blake in the second heat. Julian Forte of Jamaica was the fastest in the round, clocking 9.99 seconds in the third heat; Simbine finished 4th and qualified for the semis as a fastest loser, almost confirming claims he had already peaked earlier in the season. In the final heat, Bolt won with his slowest time of the season; his terrible start showed signs that he was, indeed, retiring at the right time.

In the first semi-final, Justin Gatlin qualified but seemed to struggle, losing to Akani Simbine of South Africa. Both were favorites to dethrone Bolt. In the second semi-final, Yohan Blake barely held off the hometown favorite Reece Prescod, who had a sudden surge of speed in the last ten metres to take the automatic qualifying spot from Su Bingtian of China. Run into slight headwinds, the first two semis were unimpressive, slower than ten seconds. In the third semi-final, Christian Coleman surprised the world by beating Bolt with 9.97 to his 9.98, despite it being a semi-final; in doing so, he became the first man in four years to beat Bolt, the last being Gatlin by the same margin (0.01) in an IAAF Diamond League event in Rome. Coleman rocketed out of the start, while Bolt lumbered. Bolt tried to make up the gap, but sensing he couldn't catch him, eased up at the finish. Bolt's time was still the second fastest in the semis.

In the final, Bolt was lined up in lane four, right next to his young rival Coleman. Gatlin lined up in lane eight, with Blake right next to him. At the gun, Coleman got the quickest reaction time, of 0.123, and Bolt with the second slowest in 0.183. Coleman continued with his usual fast start, with Bolt next to him lumbering behind by a metre in fourth expecting to make up ground on Jimmy Vicaut of France and Su Bingtian inside him. Meanwhile, the other half of the field seemed to struggle in the first 40 metres, but began to catch up with the pack afterwards. At that mark, Bolt began making up ground, first on Su, then on Vicaut. With every step, Bolt gained on his young rival, but as he got closer he began to tense up. Suddenly, with 15 metres to go, Gatlin in lane eight came out of nowhere and surged ahead of the two, securing his first world title since 2005 by 0.02 seconds. Gatlin's winning time of 9.92 seconds was the slowest World Championship winning time in the 100 metres since 2003, but was a new Masters world record, beating Kim Collins' 9.93 that he set the previous year. Coleman finished second in 9.94 seconds, while Bolt was third in 9.95 seconds, equaling his seasonal best that he set in Monaco.

Records
Before the competition records were as follows:

The following records were set at the competition:

Qualification standard
The standard to qualify automatically for entry was 10.12.

Schedule
The event schedule, in local time (UTC+1), was as follows:

Results

Preliminary round
The preliminary round took place on 4 August in four heats as follows:

The first three in each heat ( Q ) and the next two fastest ( q ) qualified for the first round proper. The overall results were as follows:

Heats
The first round proper took place on 4 August in six heats as follows:

The first three in each heat ( Q ) and the next six fastest ( q ) qualified for the semi-finals. The overall results were as follows:

Semi-finals
The semi-finals took place on 5 August in three heats as follows:

The first two in each heat ( Q ) and the next two fastest ( q ) qualified for the final. The overall results were as follows:

Final
The final took place on 5 August at 21:46. The wind was −0.8 metres per second and the results were as follows (photo finish):

References

100
100 metres at the World Athletics Championships